The 36th District of the Iowa Senate is located in eastern Iowa, and is currently composed of Marshall and Tama Counties.

Current elected officials
Jeff Edler is the senator currently representing the 36th District.

The area of the 36th District contains two Iowa House of Representatives districts:
The 71st District (represented by Sue Cahill)
The 72nd District (represented by Dean Fisher)

The district is also located in Iowa's 1st congressional district, which is represented by Ashley Hinson.

Past senators
The district has previously been represented by:

Michael Lura, 1983
John Soorholtz, 1984–1992
Elaine Szymoniak, 1993–2000
Jack Holveck, 2001–2002
Paul McKinley, 2003–2012
Steve Sodders, 2013–2016
Jeff Edler, 2017–present

See also
Iowa General Assembly
Iowa Senate

References

36